

About

The 1906 Coinage Act, is an Act to govern the laws related to coinage and mints in what was then British India.

Amendments 

The Indian Coinage Amendment Act, 1947 and
The Indian Coinage Amendment Act, 1985

External links
 The Indian Coinage Act 1906

Acts of the Parliament of India